Brentwood-Darlington is a neighborhood on the southern edge of Portland, Oregon, bordering SE 45th Avenue to the west, SE Duke Street to the north, and SE 82nd Avenue to the east.  The county line separating Multnomah County from Clackamas County forms most of the neighborhood's (and the city's) southern boundary, though small portions of the neighborhood and the city extend into Clackamas County.  (Conversely, some areas in the neighborhood in Multnomah County are outside Portland city limits.)  Roughly, the southern boundary is SE Harney Drive on the eastern one-fourth, and SE Clatsop Street on the other three-quarters.

The Brentwood-Darlington Neighborhood Association dates to 1974 when it was founded as the Errol Heights Improvement Association, serving the neighborhoods of Errol Heights, Brentwood, Darlington, Harney Park, Woodmere, and Crystal Springs. In 2013, the Brentwood-Darlington Neighborhood Association held a 'visioning' process to determine future plans for the neighborhood.

The Brentwood-Darlington Community Center, run by a local non-profit agency, Impact NW and provides early childhood and other services to families in the community. Schools in the area include Woodmere Elementary School, Whitman Elementary School, Lane Middle School, ACCESS Middle School, and Community Transition Project School.

The neighborhood is home to several large scale urban gardening projects, including the Brentwood Community Garden, which was improved and expanded in 2010 through a grant from The Home Depot and Fiskars. It is also home to the Portland State University Learning Gardens Laboratory.

Brentwood-Darlington includes Brentwood Park (1951), Errol Heights Natural Area (1966), and Hazeltine Park (2001), which was named after longtime neighborhood resident and leader, Dick Hazeltine.

In 2010, a new, full-service grocery store opened in the neighborhood.

Demographics 
As of the 2010 Census Brentwood-Darlington has a population of 12,994. The resents of the area identify as 72.0% White, 10.4% Asian, 3.6% Black, 1.6% American Indian, and 5.4% are mixed race. Of the population 13.9% identify as Hispanic or Latino.

History 

Brentwood-Darlington started as single family homesteads in 1882. The streets were divided into a grid pattern with long blocks with many of the roads leading to the nearby town of Milwaukie rather than Portland. The Donation Land Claim Act of 1850 granted settlers to unsurveyed land for promotion of settlement across the Oregon Territory. Settlers of the area took advantage of the land claim act and George Wills, a Baptist preacher and farmer eventually claimed ownership to the majority of the land in the area.

in 1920 the Apostolic Faith International Headquarters formerly the Apostolic Faith Meeting Park was established

World War II brought an influx of people into the area and lead to rapid growth in the community. It was a common to see homeowners run small businesses out of their homes during this time. As an unincorporated neighborhood of Portland many homes were inadequately constructed and roads in a state of disarray due to the lack of services in the area. Yearly grass and hazel brush fires along with runaway fires from a local sawmill lead to the first fire department to the area in 1947.

In 1974 Brentwood-Darlington was made an officially designated neighborhood under the name Errol Heights. Brentwood-Darlington received many attempts of annexation into Portland in 1961, 1971, and 1977 but the efforts made failed due to opposition of the residents of the area. Annexation attempts were revived in the 1980s due to concerns of pollution and inadequate water service and the area was successfully annexed into Portland in 1986. The former name of Errol Heights was changed to Brentwood-Darlington in February, 1986.

Parks 

 Brentwood Park (1951)
 Errol Heights Park (1966)
 Flavel Park (1953)
 Harney Park (1979)
 Hazeltine Park (2001)

References

External links

 Guide to Brentwood Darlington Neighborhood (PortlandNeighborhood.com)
 Brentwood-Darlington neighborhood looks to the future and the past with 'visioning' project (Steven Beaven, The Oregonian, May 3, 2013)
 Alternative middle school moves into Brentwood Darlington Community Center (Merry MacKinnon, The Bee, September 2, 2006)
B rentwood-Darlington Street Tree Inventory Report

 
Neighborhoods in Portland, Oregon